Three Creeks may refer to:

Three Creeks, Missouri, a village in Warren County
Three Creeks, Alberta, a community in Canada
Three Creeks Trail, a trail in California
Three Creek Lake, a lake in Oregon
Three Creeks Township in Boone County, Missouri
Three Creeks Conservation Area in Boone County, Missouri